Sesuvium is a genus of flowering plants in the ice plant family, Aizoaceae. The roughly eight species it contains are commonly known as sea-purslanes.

Selected species
 Sesuvium crithmoides Welw. – Tropical sea-purslane 
 Sesuvium edmonstonei Hook.f. – Galápagos carpet weed
 Sesuvium maritimum (Walter) B.S.P. – Slender sea-purslane
 Sesuvium microphyllum Willd.
 Sesuvium portulacastrum (L.) L. – Shoreline sea-purslane 
 Sesuvium sessile Pers. – Western sea-purslane
 Sesuvium trianthemoides Correll – Texas sea-purslane	 
 Sesuvium verrucosum Raf. – Verrucose sea-purslane

References

External links

 
Aizoaceae genera
Taxonomy articles created by Polbot